Kang Sang-woo (Hanja: 姜祥佑; born 7 October 1993) is a South Korean professional footballer who plays as a full-back or winger for Chinese Super League club Beijing Guoan.

Club career 
Kang joined Pohang Steelers in 2014 as a free agent rookie and go on to make his debut in a AFC Champions League group game on 18 March 2014 against Shandong Luneng Taishan in a 2-2 draw, where he came on as a late substitute. This would be followed by his first starting appearance, which was against Jeju United on 5 July 2014, in a league game that ended in a 0-0 draw. He would become a regular within the team until he was loaned out to Sangju Sangmu, the sports division of the Republic of Korea Armed Forces, as part of his military service.

On 15 April 2022, Kang joined Chinese Super League club Beijing Guoan. He would make his debut on 5 June 2022, in a league game against Cangzhou Mighty Lions that ended in a 2-1 defeat.

International career 
Kang was a member of the South Korea national under-20 team and represented the team at the 2013 FIFA U-20 World Cup.

He made his debut for South Korea national football team on 9 June 2021 in a World Cup qualifier against Sri Lanka.

Career statistics

Club

Honours 
South Korea U-23
King's Cup: 2015

Individual
K League 1 top assist provider: 2020
K League 1 Best XI: 2020, 2021

References

External links
 
 

1993 births
Living people
South Korean footballers
South Korea under-20 international footballers
South Korea under-23 international footballers
South Korea international footballers
Association football midfielders
Pohang Steelers players
Gimcheon Sangmu FC players
Beijing Guoan F.C. players
K League 1 players
Chinese Super League players
Expatriate footballers in China
South Korean expatriate sportspeople in China